Diego Rubén Tonetto (born 5 December 1988) is an Argentine professional footballer who plays for Independiente Rivadavia as a left winger. He also holds an Italian passport.

Football career
Born in Guaymallén, Mendoza Province, Tonetto began his career at Ferro Carril Oeste. On 31 March 2008 he made his senior debut, against Club Atlético Belgrano. He scored his first goal on 1 November against Chacarita Juniors, and finished his second season with 35 appearances and four goals, producing roughly the same numbers in the two following campaigns.

Tonetto left the club in January 2012 by mutual consent. In August, he signed a contract with Spanish side CD Lugo, making his Segunda División debut on the 18th against Hércules CF.

Tonetto scored his first goal in Europe on 29 September 2012, helping the Galicians to a 2–0 home win over CD Mirandés.

References

External links

1988 births
Living people
Sportspeople from Mendoza Province
Argentine footballers
Association football wingers
Primera Nacional players
Segunda División players
Ferro Carril Oeste footballers
Independiente Rivadavia footballers
Defensa y Justicia footballers
Instituto footballers
Club Atlético Platense footballers
Deportivo Morón footballers
CD Lugo players
Deportivo Maipú players
Argentine expatriate footballers
Expatriate footballers in Spain
Argentine expatriate sportspeople in Spain
Argentine people of Italian descent